Charles Anthony Standish Brooks (25 February 1932 – 3 May 2022) was a British racing driver also known as the "Racing Dentist". He participated in 39 Formula One World Championship Grands Prix, competing for the first time on 14 July 1956, and achieved six wins, 10 podium finishes and 75 career points. He also scored the first win by a British driver in a British car in a Grand Prix since 1923, driving a Connaught at Syracuse in 1955 in a non-championship race.

After the death of Sir Stirling Moss in 2020 and before his own death in 2022, Brooks was the last surviving Grand Prix winner from the 1950s.

Career
Brooks was born on 25 February 1932, in Dukinfield, Cheshire, and educated at Mount St Mary's College. He was the son of a dental surgeon, Charles Standish Brooks, and studied the practice himself. He was also a cousin of Norman Standish Brooks, a former British Olympic swimmer. He took up racing in 1952 and drove a Healey and a Frazer Nash at club events until 1955. In that same year, Brooks drove a Formula Two Connaught at Crystal Palace and finished fourth. Later in 1955, Brooks made his first Formula One start at the non-championship 1955 Syracuse Grand Prix, winning the race. This was the first international Grand Prix win for a British car since the 1924 San Sebastián Grand Prix.

Brooks claimed the first victory for a British-constructed car in a World Championship race in the 1957 British Grand Prix at Aintree, which he shared with Stirling Moss. Along with Moss, Brooks is considered one of the best drivers never to have been World Champion and both Moss and three-time World Champion Jack Brabham were known to have thought highly of his ability.

In 1959, Brooks, together with Brabham and Moss, had a chance to win the title due to the retirement (and subsequent death in a road accident) of Mike Hawthorn and the death, the previous season, of Peter Collins. Brooks started well, with a second place at Monaco, behind Brabham. He failed to finish at the Dutch Grand Prix, but dominantly won the French Grand Prix at Reims. Having failed to finish in a Vanwall at the British Grand Prix which he drove due to Ferrari workers in Italy being on strike, he won the only German Grand Prix of Formula One to be held at AVUS. The race was split unusually into two heats, and he won both. He had a slow car in Portugal, qualifying 10th and finishing five laps down. He retired shortly after the start at Monza but was still in contention to win the championship. At the first ever United States Grand Prix for Formula One at Sebring, he was hit by German teammate Wolfgang von Trips and pitted to check for any damage, losing two minutes. It proved to be a waste of time, but still finished in third place. He finished second in the championship with 27 points, seven behind Brabham, and one-and-a-half ahead of Moss.

Brooks won six races for Vanwall and Ferrari, secured four pole positions, achieved ten podiums, and scored a total of 75 championship points. He drove for BRM but retired from the team at the end of 1961, just before their most successful season. He ended his career with a third place at the first ever United States Grand Prix at Watkins Glen.

He was also an accomplished sports car driver, winning both the 1957 1000 km Nürburgring and the 1958 RAC Tourist Trophy, with co-driver, Moss, racing an Aston Martin DBR1. He was less successful at Le Mans in 1957, due again to an accident which occurred while racing an Aston Martin DBR1 at that year's 24-hour race, which brought about a change in his racing philosophy. A crash in the 1956 British Grand Prix and the subsequent Le Mans crash both occurred in cars with mechanical problems, of which he was aware, and Brooks, being a devout Catholic, vowed he would never again risk his life in a car that was in less than sound condition.

He had fewer qualms when it came to his own condition, however: "I was lucky in the Le Mans shunt in that I didn't break anything, but I did have very severe abrasions – there was a hole in the side of my thigh I could literally have put my fist into." It was with these injuries that he went on to race in the 1957 British GP with Moss, and win.

In 2007, Brooks was honoured by his home town. The Dukinfield District Assembly, part of Tameside Council, held a dinner in his honour and unveiled a plaque outside his former home on Park Lane.

Brooks died aged 90 on 3 May 2022.

Racing record

Complete Formula One World Championship results
(key) (Races in bold indicate pole position; races in italics indicate fastest lap)

* Brooks won the 1957 British Grand Prix sharing his car with Stirling Moss. Both were awarded half points for their victory (4 instead of 8).
** Brooks was also awarded one point in the 1957 Italian Grand Prix and 1959 German Grand Prix for recording the fastest lap.

Non-championship results
(key) (Races in bold indicate pole position)
(Races in italics indicate fastest lap)

References

External links

Profile at grandprix.com

1932 births
2022 deaths
People from Dukinfield
Sportspeople from Cheshire
English racing drivers
English Formula One drivers
BRM Formula One drivers
Vanwall Formula One drivers
Ferrari Formula One drivers
Formula One race winners
British Racing Partnership Formula One drivers
Reg Parnell Racing Formula One drivers
24 Hours of Le Mans drivers
World Sportscar Championship drivers
People educated at Mount St Mary's College